Jennifer Lee Lindberg (born July 30, 1981) is an American musician, singer-songwriter and record producer, best known as the bassist of the indie rock band Warpaint. In 2015, Lindberg released her first solo album, Right On!, under the name "Jennylee".

Personal life
Lindberg was born on July 30, 1981 in Elko, Nevada. She is the daughter of Sherry Sossamon, a nurse, and Todd Lindberg. She is the sister of actress and musician Shannyn Sossamon. Following their parents' divorce when Lindberg was two, she and her sister were raised by their mother, who remarried to Randy Goldman. Her maternal grandmother is of Hawaiian and Filipino descent, while the rest of her ancestry is English, German, Dutch, French and Irish. Raised in Reno, Nevada, Lindberg relocated to Los Angeles, California as an adult.

She was formerly married to Chris Cunningham, best known for directing the music videos for Aphex Twin's "Come to Daddy" and "Windowlicker" singles. They divorced in 2016.

Career

Warpaint

Lindberg had a "chance encounter" with Emily Kokal during one of Sossamon's DJ sets, soon after relocating to Los Angeles, and formed Warpaint with her, Theresa Wayman and Sossamon on Valentine's Day 2004. After rehearsing and composing original material alone for 18 months, Warpaint began performing regularly in Los Angeles and self-released their debut extended play, Exquisite Corpse, in August 2008.

Warpaint's debut studio album, The Fool, was released in October 2010 on Rough Trade Records following a number of lineup changes, including the recruitment of drummer Stella Mozgawa. The album was well received by critics and peaked at No. 176 on the Billboard 200. The band's second eponymous studio album was released in January 2014, and featured Lindberg performing vocals on two tracks: "Disco//very" and "CC". Receiving favorable reviews and charting in several countries, Warpaint reached the top 10 on the UK Albums Chart, Irish Independent Albums Chart, and Billboards Alternative, Independent and Tastemaker album charts.

Right On!

Lindberg's debut solo studio album, Right On!, was released on December 11, 2015 on Rough Trade; she was credited as "Jennylee". Featuring elements of new wave and gothic rock, the album was produced by Lindberg with Norm Block and featured Warpaint's Mozgawa on drums.

Collaborations
Lindberg has collaborated with other musicians during her career. In 2009, she played bass on Brian Blades Mama Rosa (2009). She later played bass on "Goodbye Lovers & Friends", a song from Boom Bips Zig Zaj (2011), and "The Madness of Clouds", a song from Viv Albertines The Vermilion Border (2013). Lindberg worked with Jimmy Giannopoulos of Lolawolf on the project CRW$HD. In 2020 she played bass on Phoebe Bridgers's album Punisher. In 2021 as part of her 'Singles Club' project, Lindberg collaborated with Depeche Mode frontman Dave Gahan on the single "Stop Speaking".

Influences
When she was young, Lindberg listened to Tears for Fears, which influenced her later music. She has also cited among her influences Jah Wobble's bass playing with PiL in her "list of all-time greats". She named Siouxsie Sioux of Siouxsie and the Banshees as one of her favorite voices of all time, saying, "I have a lot of respect for Siouxsie and she's given me a lot of inspiration over the years". Sylvester, Carly Simon, Art of Noise, Kraftwerk, Aphex Twin and Depeche Mode were other acts that inspired her.

Discography
Solo
Right On! (2015)
Heart Tax (2022)

With Warpaint

Exquisite Corpse EP (2008)
The Fool (2010)
Warpaint (2014)
Heads Up (2016)
Radiate Like This (2022)

Guest appearances
Brian Blade – Mama Rosa (2009)
Boom Bip – "Goodbye Lovers & Friends" on Zig Zaj (2011)
Viv Albertine – "The Madness of Clouds" on The Vermilion Border (2012)
TT (Theresa Wayman) – "Take One" on LoveLaws (2018)

References

External links

 at AllMusic

1981 births
American women rock singers
American women singer-songwriters
American indie rock musicians
American new wave musicians
American people of Dutch descent
American people of Filipino descent
American people of French descent
American people of German descent
American people of Irish descent
Record producers from California
American rock bass guitarists
Art rock musicians
Women bass guitarists
Living people
Musicians from Reno, Nevada
21st-century American bass guitarists
Singer-songwriters from California
Guitarists from Los Angeles
Guitarists from Nevada
21st-century American women musicians
21st-century American singers
21st-century American women singers
American women record producers
Warpaint (band) members
Singer-songwriters from Nevada